Aimsir ("weather, season") is a restaurant in County Kildare, Ireland. The head chef is Jordan Bailey, formerly of Maaemo, and his wife Majken Bech is manager.

Located in Lyons Demesne next to Aylmer Bridge on the Grand Canal, Aimsir opened in 2019 and won two Michelin stars in its first year, one of only four Irish restaurants ever to get that honour.

Awards
 Michelin star: since 2020

See also
List of Michelin starred restaurants in Ireland

References

External links
Official page

Michelin Guide starred restaurants in Ireland
Restaurants in County Kildare
Irish companies established in 2019